Vladimir Vladimirovich Kireyev (born 7 January 1972) is a former Russian football player.

References

1972 births
Living people
Soviet footballers
Russian footballers
FC Lokomotiv Nizhny Novgorod players
Russian Premier League players
FC Torpedo NN Nizhny Novgorod players
Russian expatriate footballers
Expatriate footballers in Kazakhstan
FC Kaisar players
Association football midfielders
FC Khimik Dzerzhinsk players
Sportspeople from Nizhny Novgorod